Lisa George (born 15 October 1970) is an English actress.  She has played the role of Beth Tinker in the ITV soap opera Coronation Street since 2011. In 2020, George competed in the twelfth series of Dancing on Ice, finishing in fifth place.

Career

Coronation Street
In August 2011, she began portraying the role of Beth Tinker, the ex-girlfriend of Steve McDonald (Simon Gregson), in two episodes of Coronation Street. She was later brought back as a regular cast member. For her role as Beth, George has been nominated as Best Newcomer in the 2012 annual TV Choice Awards. She stated she was "shocked and over the moon" to be nominated for the award.

George also played the family liaison officer for the Harrises during 2005, after Katy killed Tommy, prior to appearing as Beth Sutherland in 2011.

Other ventures
In 1997, George toured with a stage musical production of Prisoner: Cell Block H. Her television credits include a role in the 2003 BAFTA nominated television adaptation of the Jacqueline Wilson novel The Illustrated Mum, as well as episodes of British serial dramas Casualty, Holby City and Emmerdale.

In 2020, George began competing in the twelfth series of Dancing on Ice, alongside professional partner Tom Naylor.

Filmography

References

External links
 
 

Living people
Alumni of the Royal Welsh College of Music & Drama
British television actresses
English soap opera actresses
People from Grimsby
Actresses from Lincolnshire
1970 births